Cobresol FBC was a Peruvian football club based in the city of Moquegua, Peru. Founded in 2008, the club gained promotion from the Segunda División Peruana after winning the 2010 championship, moving to the Torneo Descentralizado in 2011, before being relegated back to Segunda Division after a last-place finish in 2012. 

In 2013, the team dissolved due to financial problems.

Kit and badge

Last squad

Notable players

Managers
 Freddy García (Jan 2010–Dec 10)
 Teddy Cardama (Jan 2011–April 11)
 Jorge Espejo (interim) (May 2012)
 Javier Chirinos (May 2012–July 2012)
 Germán Pinillos (July 2012–September 2012)
 Octavio Vidales (September 2012–)

Honours

National
Peruvian Segunda División: 1
Winners (1): 2010
Runner-up (1): 2009

Regional
Región VII: 1
Winners (1): 2008

Liga Departamental de Moquegua: 1
Winners (1): 2008

Liga Provincial de Moquegua: 1
Winners (1): 2008

Liga Distrital de Moquegua: 1
Winners (1): 2008

See also
List of football clubs in Peru
Peruvian football league system

External links
 Club website
 How Cobresol was born?

Football clubs in Peru
Association football clubs established in 2008